José 'Pep' Balaguer Berga (born 1 December 1950) is a Spanish retired footballer who played as a goalkeeper, and is a coach.

He is well known for his long-serving career in Valencia CF, where he amassed 9 seasons in the first team. After retiring in 1981, Balaguer worked as a manager.

Managerial career
Immediately after retiring Balaguer started working as a manager, initially being manager of the youth categories with Valencia CF. He was appointed head coach of Levante UD for the last 10 games of the 1997–98 season, failing to avoid relegation, however. He returned to Segunda División at his first attempt, being dismissed only in January 2002. In February 2003, he was appointed Gimnàstic de Tarragona manager.

In April 2004 Balaguer was appointed FC Cartagena manager, being relieved from his duties in October. In December 2005 he was appointed Valencian Community autonomous football team manager.

References

External links
 
 

1950 births
Living people
Spanish footballers
Footballers from the Valencian Community
Association football goalkeepers
La Liga players
Segunda División players
Valencia CF Mestalla footballers
Valencia CF players
Spanish football managers
Valencia CF Mestalla managers
Levante UD managers
Gimnàstic de Tarragona managers
FC Cartagena managers